Fashion Street refers to a cluster of over 385 street side clothing shops on MG Road near Azad Maidan and is opposite to Bombay Gymkhana, in South Mumbai, India.

The market is located just opposite VSNL office building at Mahatma Gandhi Road (MG Road). It is a popular tourist destination, and is known for bargaining.

In January 2011, as a part of the green drive of BMC along with Fashion Street Shopowners' Association, the market at Fashion Street stopped the use plastic bags, and switched to paper bag, now they are again using plastics made by the training workshop of the National Association of the Blind.It's a very large shopping place in Mumbai.

References 

Streets in Mumbai
Shopping districts and streets in India
Clothing retailers of India
Indian fashion
Retail markets in Mumbai